Cytochrome P450 4V2 is a protein that in humans is encoded by the CYP4V2 gene.

Mutations are associated with Bietti's crystalline dystrophy and retinitis pigmentosas.

References

Further reading